The 2006 Monte Carlo Rally (formally the 74th Rallye Automobile de Monte-Carlo) was the first round of the 2006 World Rally Championship. The race was held over three days between 20 and 22 January 2006, and was won by Ford's Marcus Grönholm, his 19th win in the World Rally Championship.

Report 
The first event of the season saw many changes from the previous year. The new season saw just two full manufacturer teams compete (Ford and Subaru). Citroën supported a semi works effort through the Kronos team. Stobart increased their profile by creating a team using old Fords. OMV Peugeot Norway used the Peugeot 307 while Skoda maintained their presence through a team sponsored by Red Bull.

On the drivers front, Ford had a new lineup consisting of two time champion Marcus Grönholm and the promising young driver Mikko Hirvonen. Kronos used Citroëns twice world champion Sébastien Loeb alongside Xavier Pons. Subaru retained Petter Solberg with Stéphane Sarrazin and Chris Atkinson due to share the second seat depending on the surface. Stobart used a mixture of drivers alongside Matthew Wilson in his first full year. Manfred Stohl and Henning Solberg used the previously unloved Peugeot 307s. There were no places for Markko Märtin who fired an angry broadside before the Monte Carlo Rally at the direction the sport was taking. Toni Gardemeister lost his place at Ford along with Roman Kresta, both not doing enough to impress Malcolm Wilson during 2005. François Duval didn't find a seat after his erratic 2005 season, and there was still no place available for Colin McRae despite two promising performances for Skoda in 2005.

Results

Special stages
All dates and times are CET (UTC+1).

Championship standings after the event

Drivers' championship

Manufacturers' championship

References

External links
 Results at eWRC.com
 Results from the official site: WRC.com
 Results on RallyBase.nl

Monte Carlo
2006
Rally
Monte